The following is an alphabetical list of articles related to the United States Commonwealth of Virginia.

0–9 
 
.va.us – Internet second-level domain for the Commonwealth of Virginia
10th State to ratify the Constitution of the United States of America

A
Adjacent states and federal district:

Agriculture in Virginia
Airports in Virginia
Amusement parks in Virginia
Aquaria in Virginia
commons:Category:Aquaria in Virginia
Arboreta in Virginia
commons:Category:Arboreta in Virginia
Archaeology in Virginia
:Category:Archaeological sites in Virginia
commons:Category:Archaeological sites in Virginia
Architecture in Virginia
Area codes in Virginia
Art museums and galleries in Virginia
commons:Category:Art museums and galleries in Virginia
Astronomical observatories in Virginia
commons:Category:Astronomical observatories in Virginia
Attorney General of the Commonwealth of Virginia

B
Beaches of Virginia
commons:Category:Beaches of Virginia
Botanical gardens in Virginia
commons:Category:Botanical gardens in Virginia
Buildings and structures in Virginia
commons:Category:Buildings and structures in Virginia

C

Canyons and gorges of Virginia
commons:Category:Canyons and gorges of Virginia
Capital of the Commonwealth of Virginia
Capitol of the Commonwealth of Virginia
commons:Category:Virginia State Capitol
Caves of Virginia
commons:Category:Caves of Virginia
Census statistical areas of Virginia
Chesapeake Bay
Cities in Virginia
commons:Category:Cities in Virginia
Climate of Virginia
:Category:Climate of Virginia
commons:Category:Climate of Virginia
Colleges and universities in Virginia
commons:Category:Universities and colleges in Virginia
Commonwealth of Virginia  website
Constitution of the Commonwealth of Virginia
Government of the Commonwealth of Virginia
:Category:Government of Virginia
commons:Category:Government of Virginia
Executive branch of the government of the Commonwealth of Virginia
Governor of the Commonwealth of Virginia
Legislative branch of the government of the Commonwealth of Virginia
General Assembly of the Commonwealth of Virginia
Senate of the Commonwealth of Virginia
House of Delegates of the Commonwealth of Virginia
Judicial branch of the government of the Commonwealth of Virginia
Supreme Court of the Commonwealth of Virginia
Communications in Virginia
commons:Category:Communications in Virginia
Companies in Virginia
Congressional districts of Virginia
Constitution of the Commonwealth of Virginia
Convention centers in Virginia
commons:Category:Convention centers in Virginia
Counties of the Commonwealth of Virginia
commons:Category:Counties in Virginia
Culture of Virginia
:Category:Virginia culture
commons:Category:Virginia culture

D
Demographics of Virginia
:Category:Demographics of Virginia

E
Economy of Virginia
:Category:Economy of Virginia
commons:Category:Economy of Virginia
Education in Virginia
:Category:Education in Virginia
commons:Category:Education in Virginia
Elections in the State of Virginia
commons:Category:Virginia elections
Environment of Virginia
commons:Category:Environment of Virginia

F

Festivals in Virginia
commons:Category:Festivals in Virginia
Fictional characters from Virginia
Flag of the Commonwealth of Virginia
Forts in Virginia
:Category:Forts in Virginia
commons:Category:Forts in Virginia

G

General Assembly of the Commonwealth of Virginia
Geography of Virginia
:Category:Geography of Virginia
commons:Category:Geography of Virginia
List of gaps of Virginia
Geology of Virginia
commons:Category:Geology of Virginia
Ghost towns in Virginia
:Category:Ghost towns in Virginia
commons:Category:Ghost towns in Virginia
Golf clubs and courses in Virginia
Government of the Commonwealth of Virginia  website
:Category:Government of Virginia
commons:Category:Government of Virginia
Governor of the Commonwealth of Virginia
List of governors of Virginia
Great Seal of the Commonwealth of Virginia

H
High schools of Virginia
Higher education in Virginia
Highway system of Virginia
Hiking trails in Virginia
commons:Category:Hiking trails in Virginia
Historic houses in Virginia
History of Virginia
Historical outline of Virginia
:Category:History of Virginia
commons:Category:History of Virginia
Hospitals in Virginia
Hot springs of Virginia
commons:Category:Hot springs of Virginia
House of Delegates of the Commonwealth of Virginia

I
Images of Virginia
commons:Category:Virginia
Islands of Virginia

J
Jamestown, Virginia, colonial capital 1619-1698

K

L
Lakes in Virginia
:Category:Lakes of Virginia
commons:Category:Lakes of Virginia
Landmarks in Virginia
commons:Category:Landmarks in Virginia
Lesser Seal of the Commonwealth of Virginia
Lieutenant Governor of the Commonwealth of Virginia
Lists related to the Commonwealth of Virginia:
List of airports in Virginia
List of census statistical areas in Virginia
List of cities in Virginia
List of colleges and universities in Virginia
List of United States congressional districts in Virginia
List of counties in Virginia
List of forts in Virginia
List of gaps of Virginia
List of ghost towns in Virginia
List of governors of Virginia
List of high schools in Virginia
List of historic houses in Virginia
List of hospitals in Virginia
List of individuals executed in Virginia
List of islands of Virginia
List of lakes in Virginia
List of law enforcement agencies in Virginia
List of lieutenant governors of Virginia
List of museums in Virginia
List of National Historic Landmarks in Virginia
List of newspapers in Virginia
List of people from Virginia
List of primary state highways in Virginia
List of radio stations in Virginia
List of railroads in Virginia
List of Registered Historic Places in Virginia
List of rivers of Virginia
List of school districts in Virginia
List of secondary state highways in Virginia
List of state forests in Virginia
List of state parks in Virginia
List of state prisons in Virginia
List of symbols of the Commonwealth of Virginia
List of telephone area codes in Virginia
List of television stations in Virginia
List of towns in Virginia
List of United States congressional delegations from Virginia
List of United States congressional districts in Virginia
List of United States representatives from Virginia
List of United States senators from Virginia
Former counties, cities, and towns of Virginia

M
Maps of Virginia
commons:Category:Maps of Virginia
Mass media in Virginia
Monuments and memorials in Virginia
commons:Category:Monuments and memorials in Virginia
Mountains of Virginia
commons:Category:Mountains of Virginia
Museums in Virginia
:Category:Museums in Virginia
commons:Category:Museums in Virginia
Music of Virginia
:Category:Music of Virginia
commons:Category:Music of Virginia
:Category:Musical groups from Virginia
:Category:Musicians from Virginia

N
National Forests of Virginia
commons:Category:National Forests of Virginia
Natural arches of Virginia
commons:Category:Natural arches of Virginia
Natural history of Virginia
commons:Category:Natural history of Virginia
Newport News, Virginia
Newspapers of Virginia

O
Outdoor sculptures in Virginia
commons:Category:Outdoor sculptures in Virginia

P
The Pentagon
People from Virginia
:Category:People from Virginia
commons:Category:People from Virginia
:Category:People by era in Virginia
:Category:People by city in Virginia
:Category:People by county in Virginia
:Category:People from Virginia by occupation
:Category:Fictional characters from Virginia
Poet Laureate of Virginia
Politics of Virginia
:Category:Politics of Virginia
commons:Category:Politics of Virginia
Potomac River
Primary state highways in Virginia
Protected areas of Virginia
commons:Category:Protected areas of Virginia

Q

R
Radio stations in Virginia
Railroad museums in Virginia
commons:Category:Railroad museums in Virginia
Railroads in Virginia
Registered historic places in Virginia
commons:Category:Registered Historic Places in Virginia
Religion in Virginia
:Category:Religion in Virginia
commons:Category:Religion in Virginia
Richmond, Virginia, state capital since 1780, CSA capital 1861-1865
Rivers of Virginia
commons:Category:Rivers of Virginia

S
School districts of Virginia
Scouting in Virginia
Seals of the Commonwealth of Virginia
Secondary state highways in Virginia
Senate of the Commonwealth of Virginia
Settlements in Virginia
Cities in Virginia
Towns in Virginia
Census Designated Places in Virginia
Other unincorporated communities in Virginia
List of ghost towns in Virginia
Sports in Virginia
:Category:Sports in Virginia
commons:Category:Sports in Virginia
:Category:Sports venues in Virginia
commons:Category:Sports venues in Virginia
State Capitol of Virginia
State of Virginia – see: Commonwealth of Virginia
State parks of Virginia
commons:Category:State parks of Virginia
State prisons of Virginia
Structures in Virginia
commons:Category:Buildings and structures in Virginia
Supreme Court of the Commonwealth of Virginia
Symbols of the Commonwealth of Virginia
:Category:Symbols of Virginia
commons:Category:Symbols of Virginia

T
Telecommunications in Virginia
commons:Category:Communications in Virginia
Telephone area codes in Virginia
Television shows set in Virginia
Television stations in Virginia
Tennessee Valley Authority
Theatres in Virginia
commons:Category:Theatres in Virginia
Tourism in Virginia  website
commons:Category:Tourism in Virginia
Towns in Virginia
commons:Category:Cities in Virginia
Transportation in Virginia
:Category:Transportation in Virginia
commons:Category:Transport in Virginia

U
United States of America
States of the United States of America
United States census statistical areas of Virginia
United States congressional delegations from Virginia
United States congressional districts in Virginia
United States Court of Appeals for the Fourth Circuit
United States District Court for the Eastern District of Virginia
United States District Court for the Western District of Virginia
United States representatives from Virginia
United States senators from Virginia
Universities and colleges in Virginia
commons:Category:Universities and colleges in Virginia
US-VA – ISO 3166-2:US region code for the Commonwealth of Virginia

V
VA – United States Postal Service postal code for the Commonwealth of Virginia
Virginia website
:Category:Virginia
commons:Category:Virginia
commons:Category:Maps of Virginia
Virginia Association of Communication Arts and Sciences (VACAS))
Virginia Beach, Virginia
Virginia Community Corps
Virginia Petroleum Convenience and Grocery Association
Virginia Philosophical Association
Virginia Police Canine Association
Virginia Press Women Inc
Virginia State Board of Censors
Virginia State Capitol
Virginia state elections, 1999
Virginia State Route 846 (Loudoun County)

W
Washington-Arlington-Alexandria, DC-VA-MD-WV Metropolitan Statistical Area
Washington-Baltimore-Northern Virginia, DC-MD-VA-WV Combined Statistical Area
Water parks in Virginia
Waterfalls of Virginia
commons:Category:Waterfalls of Virginia
Wikimedia
Wikimedia Commons:Category:Virginia
commons:Category:Maps of Virginia
Wikinews:Category:Virginia
Wikinews:Portal:Virginia
Wikipedia Category:Virginia
Wikipedia Portal:Virginia
Wikipedia:WikiProject Virginia
:Category:WikiProject Virginia articles
:Category:WikiProject Virginia members
Williamsburg, Virginia, colonial and state capital 1698-1780

X

Y

Z
Zoos in Virginia
commons:Category:Zoos in Virginia

See also

 Virginia
 Outline of Virginia
 
 

Virginia
 
Virginia